Paradoxica asymmetrica is a moth of the [family Erebidae first described by Michael Fibiger in 2011. It is found on Hainan Island in China.

The wingspan is about 11 mm. The forewings are short and narrow and the ground colour is beige with a black-brown patch basally at the costa and a quadrangular patch in the upper medial area. The colour is brown in the subterminal and terminal areas. The crosslines are weakly marked and light brown. The terminal line is indicated by dark-brown interveinal dots. The hindwing ground colour is grey with a well-marked discal spot.

References

Micronoctuini
Moths described in 2011